The Return of Memel Commemorative Medal (Medaille zur Erinnerung an die Heimkehr des Memellandes; 22. März 1939) was a decoration of Nazi Germany awarded during the interwar period, the last in a series of Occupation Medals.

Description
Germany annexed the Klaipėda Region (Memel Territory) from Lithuania on 22 March 1939 after an ultimatum. On 23 March the occupation of the city and district was carried out by German Army troops. This area of East Prussia, with 160,000 inhabitants, had been turned over to Lithuania in the aftermath of World War I. To commemorate the occupation, the "Memel Medal" was authorized on 1 May 1939. It was awarded until 31 December 1940. In all 31,322 medals were awarded.

The wearing of Nazi era awards was banned in 1945. The Memel Medal was not among those awards reauthorized for official wear by the Federal Republic of Germany in 1957.

Design
The medal was designed by Professor Richard Klein. While the obverse was the same as the previous two occupation medals, the reverse was inscribed "Zur Erinnerung an die Heimkehr des Memellandes 22. März 1939" (To commemorate the return of the Memel District. 22 March 1939), surrounded by an oak leaf wreath. The award was presented to all military, political and civil personnel who had taken part in the entry into Memel on 22 March 1939, and to local Nazis who had worked for union with Germany.

The medal was die-struck in bronze and worn above the left tunic pocket suspended from a white ribbon with a green strip in the middle and two red strips on each side, the historic colors of Lithuania Minor.

See also
Anschluss Medal
Sudetenland Medal
Orders, decorations, and medals of Nazi Germany

References

Bibliography 

Orders, decorations, and medals of Nazi Germany
Klaipėda Region
German campaign medals
Germany–Lithuania relations
Awards established in 1939